Castavinols are natural phenolic compounds found in red wines. These molecules are colorless and are derived from anthocyanin pigments. Thus their formation leads to a wine color loss.

Known molecules 
 Castavinol C1
 Castavinol C2
 Castavinol C3
 Castavinol C4

References

External links 
 1996 : Les molécules des futurs millésimes Bordelais ? C. Castagnino, C. Chèze and J. Vercauteren, Bull. Soc. Pharm. Bordeaux, 1997, 136, pp. 19-36 (French)

Flavonoids